The 2022–23 season is the 130th season in the existence of Newcastle United and the club's sixth consecutive season in the Premier League. In addition to the league, they also competed in the FA Cup and EFL Cup, finishing as runners-up in the latter competition.

Staff

Squad

Players and squad numbers last updated on 17 March 2023.Appearances include all competitions.Note: Flags indicate national team as has been defined under FIFA eligibility rules. Players may hold more than one non-FIFA nationality.

Pre-season and friendlies
Newcastle United confirmed they would play friendly matches against Gateshead, 1860 Munich, Mainz 05, Benfica, Atalanta, and Athletic Bilbao as part of their pre-season schedule. Whilst Newcastle United were in Lisbon for their training camp, they played two training matches against Burnley behind closed doors.

On 21 October 2022, Newcastle United announced that the first team squad would return to Saudi Arabia for a warm-weather training camp when the Premier League season pauses for the 2022 FIFA World Cup. As part of that visit, it was also confirmed that Newcastle United would play a friendly match against Saudi Professional League side Al Hilal on 8 December 2022. Newcastle United also confirmed they would play a friendly match against Rayo Vallecano on 17 December 2022 before the Premier League season restarts after the 2022 FIFA World Cup.

Competitions

Overall record

Premier League

League table

Results summary

Results by round

Matches

On 16 June, the Premier League fixtures were released.

FA Cup

The Magpies entered the FA Cup in the third round, and were drawn away to Sheffield Wednesday.

EFL Cup

The Magpies entered the EFL Cup in the second round, and were drawn away to Tranmere Rovers. They were then drawn at home to Crystal Palace in the third round, Bournemouth in the fourth round and Leicester City in the quarter-finals. They were then drawn against Southampton in the semi-finals. The Magpies then advanced to the final, which they would play against Manchester United.

Transfers

Transfers in

Loans in

Loans out

Transfers out

Statistics

Appearances and goals
Last updated on 17 March 2023.

|-
! colspan=14 style=background:#dcdcdc; text-align:center| Goalkeepers

|-
! colspan=14 style=background:#dcdcdc; text-align:center| Defenders

|-
! colspan=14 style=background:#dcdcdc; text-align:center| Midfielders

|-
! colspan=14 style=background:#dcdcdc; text-align:center| Forwards

|-
! colspan=14 style=background:#dcdcdc; text-align:center| Player(s) who left on loan but featured this season

|-
! colspan=14 style=background:#dcdcdc; text-align:center| Player(s) who left permanently but featured this season

|}

Goals
Last updated on 17 March 2023.

Disciplinary record
Last updated on 17 March 2023.

Clean sheets
Last updated on 24 January 2023.

Awards

FUN88 Player of the Month

Premier League Manager of the Month

Premier League Player of the Month

Premier League Goal of the Month

Premier League Save of the Month

Seasonal Awards

Kits

References

Newcastle United
Newcastle United F.C. seasons